The Women's Cathay Pacific Hong Kong Open 2013 was the women's edition of the 2013 Hong Kong Open, which is a WSA World Series event Gold (prize money: 70 000 $). The event took place in Hong Kong from 3 December to 8 December. Nicol David won her eighth Hong Kong Open trophy, beating Raneem El Weleily in the final.

Prize money and ranking points
For 2013, the prize purse was $70,000. The prize money and points breakdown is as follows:

Seeds

Draw and results

See also
Hong Kong Open (squash)
Men's Hong Kong squash Open 2013
WSA World Series 2013

References

Squash tournaments in Hong Kong
Women's Hong Kong Open (squash)
Women's Hong Kong Open (squash)
2013 in women's squash